Bouhamidoceras is an extinct genus of cephalopod belonging to the Ammonite subclass.

Distribution
Jurassic deposites of Hungary and Tunisia.

References

Jurassic ammonites